The National Center for Biotechnology Information (NCBI) is part of the United States National Library of Medicine (NLM), a branch of the National Institutes of Health (NIH). It is approved and funded by the government of the United States. The NCBI is located in Bethesda, Maryland, and was founded in 1988 through legislation sponsored by US Congressman Claude Pepper.

The NCBI houses a series of databases relevant to biotechnology and biomedicine and is an important resource for bioinformatics tools and services. Major databases include GenBank for DNA sequences and PubMed, a bibliographic database for biomedical literature. Other databases include the NCBI Epigenomics database. All these databases are available online through the Entrez search engine. NCBI was directed by David Lipman, one of the original authors of the BLAST sequence alignment program and a widely respected figure in bioinformatics.

GenBank

NCBI had responsibility for making available the GenBank DNA sequence database since 1992. GenBank coordinates with individual laboratories and other sequence databases, such as those of the European Molecular Biology Laboratory (EMBL) and the DNA Data Bank of Japan (DDBJ).

Since 1992, NCBI has grown to provide other databases in addition to GenBank. NCBI provides Gene, Online Mendelian Inheritance in Man, the Molecular Modeling Database (3D protein structures), dbSNP (a database of single-nucleotide polymorphisms), the Reference Sequence Collection, a map of the human genome, and a taxonomy browser, and coordinates with the National Cancer Institute to provide the Cancer Genome Anatomy Project. The NCBI assigns a unique identifier (taxonomy ID number) to each species of organism.

The NCBI has software tools that are available through internet browsers or by FTP. For example, BLAST is a sequence similarity searching program. BLAST can do sequence comparisons against the GenBank DNA database in less than 15 seconds.

NCBI Bookshelf
The NCBI Bookshelf is a collection of freely accessible, downloadable, online versions of selected biomedical books. The Bookshelf covers a wide range of topics including molecular biology, biochemistry, cell biology, genetics, microbiology, disease states from a molecular and cellular point of view, research methods, and virology. Some of the books are online versions of previously published books, while others, such as Coffee Break, are written and edited by NCBI staff. The Bookshelf is a complement to the Entrez PubMed repository of peer-reviewed publication abstracts in that Bookshelf contents provide established perspectives on evolving areas of study and a context in which many disparate individual pieces of reported research can be organized.

Basic Local Alignment Search Tool (BLAST)
BLAST is an algorithm used for calculating sequence similarity between biological sequences, such as nucleotide sequences of DNA and amino acid sequences of proteins. BLAST is a powerful tool for finding sequences similar to the query sequence within the same organism or in different organisms. It searches the query sequence on NCBI databases and servers and posts the results back to the person's browser in the chosen format. Input sequences to the BLAST are mostly in FASTA or GenBank format while output could be delivered in a variety of formats such as HTML, XML formatting, and plain text. HTML is the default output format for NCBI's web-page. Results for NCBI-BLAST are presented in graphical format with all the hits found, a table with sequence identifiers for the hits having scoring related data, along with the alignments for the sequence of interest and the hits received with analogous BLAST scores for these.

Entrez
The Entrez Global Query Cross-Database Search System is used at NCBI for all the major databases such as Nucleotide and Protein Sequences, Protein Structures, PubMed, Taxonomy, Complete Genomes, OMIM, and several others. Entrez is both an indexing and retrieval system having data from various sources for biomedical research. NCBI distributed the first version of Entrez in 1991, composed of nucleotide sequences from PDB and GenBank, protein sequences from SWISS-PROT, translated GenBank, PIR, PRF, PDB, and associated abstracts and citations from PubMed. Entrez is specially designed to integrate the data from several different sources, databases, and formats into a uniform information model and retrieval system which can efficiently retrieve that relevant references, sequences, and structures.

Gene
Gene has been implemented at NCBI to characterize and organize the information about genes. It serves as a major node in the nexus of the genomic map, expression, sequence, protein function, structure, and homology data. A unique GeneID is assigned to each gene record that can be followed through revision cycles. Gene records for known or predicted genes are established here and are demarcated by map positions or nucleotide sequences. Gene has several advantages over its predecessor, LocusLink, including, better integration with other databases in NCBI, broader taxonomic scope, and enhanced options for query and retrieval provided by the Entrez system.

Protein
Protein database maintains the text record for individual protein sequences, derived from many different resources such as NCBI Reference Sequence (RefSeq) project, GenBank, PDB, and UniProtKB/SWISS-Prot. Protein records are present in different formats including FASTA and XML and are linked to other NCBI resources. Protein provides the relevant data to the users such as genes, DNA/RNA sequences, biological pathways, expression and variation data, and literature. It also provides the pre-determined sets of similar and identical proteins for each sequence as computed by the BLAST. The Structure database of NCBI contains 3D coordinate sets for experimentally-determined structures in PDB that are imported by NCBI. 
The Conserved Domain database (CDD) of protein contains sequence profiles that characterize highly conserved domains within protein sequences. It also has records from external resources like SMART and Pfam.
There is another database of proteins known as Protein Clusters database, which contains sets of proteins sequences that are clustered according to the maximum alignments between the individual sequences as calculated by BLAST.

Pubchem database
PubChem database of NCBI is a public resource for molecules and their activities against biological assays. PubChem is searchable and accessible by Entrez information retrieval system.

See also
 DNA Data Bank of Japan (DDBJ)
 European Bioinformatics Institute (EBI)

References

External links

 
  of the National Library of Medicine]
  of the National Institutes of Health

Biotechnology organizations
Medical research institutes in Maryland
National Institutes of Health
Online databases
Online taxonomy databases